Muhteşem Yüzyıl is a Turkish historical fiction television series. Written by Meral Okay and Yılmaz Şahin, it is based on the life of Ottoman Sultan Suleiman the Magnificent, the longest-reigning Sultan of the Ottoman Empire, and his wife Hürrem Sultan, a slave girl who became the first Ottoman Haseki Sultan. It also shines the light on the era known as the Sultanate of Women. It was originally broadcast on Show TV and then transferred to Star TV.

Plot
The series follows the reign of Suleiman the Magnificent (r. 1520–1566).

At age 26, Suleiman learns that his father has died and his own reign is about to begin. He is determined to build an empire more powerful than that of Alexander the Great and to render it invincible. Throughout his 46-year reign, his fame as the greatest warrior and ruler of his age will spread both East and West. With his companion Pargalı İbrahim, Suleiman will achieve great victories, making his name known in the Muslim World. İbrahim, who marries the Sultan's sister, is referred by the Sultan as his brother, friend, and advisor.

Suleiman consolidates his power: Pargalı Ibrahim Pasha, as the Grand Vizier, reinforces the rule of law throughout the empire, meets foreign diplomats, and prepares for military campaigns. All this is set against the backdrop of tension between Christian Europe and the Ottoman Empire.

The series also focuses on the relationships between members of the imperial household, with the former slave girl and eventual chief consort and wife Hürrem Sultan inevitably figuring prominently. Themes include the animosity between Haseki Hürrem Sultan and Mahidevran Sultan, mother of the Sultan's eldest son, the role of Hafsa Sultan, the valide sultan ("Sultan Mother"), and Hürrem's unsteady career from her initial rise while pregnant with Suleiman's son, through her subsequent falls and recoveries, and finally to her eventual return to grace.

Spinoff

The story begins 37 years after the death of Suleiman the Magnificent. It recounts the life of Mahpeyker Kösem Sultan, a female ruler of the Ottoman Empire through her sons and grandson. Safiye Hatun, the favorite concubine of Şehzade Murad, reappears in the spinoff, now the grandmother of Ahmed I and the Valide Sultan.

Series overview

Characters

The Imperial Family

Statesmen and palace officials

Palace servants and concubines

Otherwise associated to the palace

Broadcast

Reception

Controversy
The show generated controversy and complaints from some viewers, for what they referred to as a "disrespectful", "indecent" and "hedonistic" portrayal of the historical sultan. Turkey's Radio and Television Supreme Council, known as RTÜK, claimed they had received over 70,000 complaints about the show and warned Show TV to publicly apologise for wrongly exposing "the privacy of a historical person". The Prime Minister Recep Tayyip Erdoğan condemned the show as "an effort to show our history in a negative light to the younger generations." An MP for the governing Justice and Development Party, Oktay Saral, went further, threatening to outlaw the "misrepresentation of historical figures" in shows such as Muhteşem Yüzyıl.
Small groups of Islamists and Nationalists protested the studio but the show remains successful with consistently high ratings.

Elif Batuman wrote in The New Yorker:
"On the surface, 'Magnificent Century' looks like a quintessential product of the Erdoğan years. Thanks to Erdoğan's economic policies, Turkey has a thriving television industry, capable of staging elaborate period dramas, and a prosperous family-oriented middle class of observant Muslims eager to watch their own values reflected in a historical imperial setting. And, much as Erdoğan's foreign policy has promoted relations with former Ottoman lands, the show has conquered large audiences in Balkan, Caucasian, and Arab countries not known for their fond memory of Ottoman rule. Broadcast to more than two hundred million viewers in fifty-two countries, "Magnificent Century" has accomplished one of Erdoğan's main goals: Making a powerful, non-secularist, globally involved version of Turkey both plausible and appealing.... And yet Erdoğan is not a fan. In late 2012, at the opening of a provincial airport he took a moment to condemn the show's depiction of Suleiman, as well as its directors and broadcasters, hinting at severe judicial repercussions."

According to the report of Radio Free Asia, some Uyghur people were arrested for watching the series in 2020, as the Chinese government considered that it might encourage the thought of the Xinjiang Independence.

International popularity
Muhteşem Yüzyıl is reported to have an international audience of 200 million viewers  in over 50 countries.

The show is part of an ongoing revival of Turkish culture in the Balkans through imported TV shows from Turkey, such as Öyle Bir Geçer Zaman Ki ("As time goes by", number one TV show in North Macedonia), or Fatmagül'ün Suçu Ne? ("What is Fatmagül's fault"), which was top ranked TV show in Kosovo 2012. Serbian sociologist Ratko Bozovic explains the popularity by pointing at the traditional, patriarchal values of the Turkish shows, and the many cultural and linguistic similarities between Turkey and the Balkan countries: "The mentality depicted in those shows has to do with a traditional understanding of morality that people in Serbia remember at some level." According to Bozovic, all Balkan countries have seen dramatic changes in terms of family life, and the Turkish shows help them recall value systems that now seem lost.

In Bangladesh, the show was known as সুলতান সুলেমান (Sultan Suleiman) and it was broadcast on Deepto TV, dubbed in Bangla. Within the first two months of its release in Bangladesh back in 2015, Sultan Suleiman received the highest TV program ratings in Bangladesh. The channel gained the most TRP ratings. Some people demanded a ban on this serial as viewers lacked interests in watching local dramas, however, keeping all these controversies aside the show still went on. After finishing the series, Deepto TV re-broadcast this massively popular show from June 2, 2019.

In Morocco, the series is called Harim al-Sultan ("The Sultan's Harem"). Many people find it visually and aesthetically enjoyable to watch, but viewers have contrasting opinions of the show's depictions of gender and Ottoman rulers. Many Moroccans stopped watching the show because they did not like the morals it presented.

In Greece, the series has become quite popular for people of all socioeconomic backgrounds and ages. Many Greek viewers enjoyed the visuals and oriental decorations present in the show, as well as the cultural proximity and historical ties between the two countries. It has become so popular that Bishop Anthimos of Thessaloniki and the Golden Dawn party condemned the show and urged Greeks not to watch it. "No one should watch Muhteşem Yüzyıl, The Magnificent Century," Anthimos said. He added, "By watching the Turkish series we are telling them we have surrendered."

In the Republic of North Macedonia, Turkish series have become so popular, that the Macedonian parliament has moved to ban Turkish soaps to reduce the Turkish impact on Macedonian society. Turkish series will gradually be removed and replaced by national programs, according to a 2012 bill authored by Elisabeti Nikolovska who has links to the Macedonian Royal Family.

In Chile where the series is called El Sultán (The Sultan) it is aired since December 14 in Canal 13 on prime time with great success. The Spanish voice of Suleiman is the same as the one of Onur in the Turkish soap opera Las mil y una noches. The series is part of a wave of Turkish soap operas that have become popular in Chilean TV. The series debuted right after the penultimate chapter of Los 80, a popular historical family drama produced by Canal 13.

In Pakistan, the show was named میرا سلطان: داستان جلال و جمال (Mera Sultan: Dastan-e-Jalal-o-Jamal; lit. My Emperor: Story of Bravery and Love) and it aired on channel Geo Kahani. Geo Kahani claims that it was the channel's most popular show and received the highest TRPs. However, the channel faced several controversies and serial got banned few times, but still completed the broadcast due to public pressure. The Pakistani drama industry was adversely affected by the popularity of Turkish dramas, and lead actor Halit Ergenç to win first ever International Icon Award in Pakistan's biggest awards show Lux Style Awards in 2017.

See also 
 List of Muhteşem Yüzyıl episodes
 Muhteşem Yüzyıl: Kösem
 Payitaht: Abdülhamid
 Diriliş: Ertuğrul
 List of Islam-related films

References

External links
 
 Muhteşem Yüzyıl – Official Website
 Muhteşem Yüzyıl Official YouTube channel

2011 Turkish television series debuts
Turkish drama television series
Suleiman the Magnificent
Television series about the Ottoman Empire
Serial drama television series
2014 Turkish television series endings
Television series set in the 16th century
Show TV original programming
Star TV (Turkey) original programming
Television series about Islam
Turkish historical television series
Television shows set in Istanbul
Television shows set in Belgrade
Television series produced in Istanbul
Television series set in the 2010s